Belson Stadium is a 2,168-seat soccer-specific stadium located at Utopia Parkway and Union Turnpike in Queens, New York City, on the campus of St. John's University. It is the home of the St. John's Red Storm men's and women's soccer teams. The stadium is unique in that it is built on top of a parking garage to save space in the dense urban environment of Queens.

The stadium is named in honor of Maxine and Jerome Belson. Mr. Belson was a graduate of St. John's law school, a member of the university's Board of Trustees and a past benefactor to the university. The Belsons donated $6 million for the construction of the stadium and an additional $5 million was raised for the parking garage and landscaping.

From 2013 to 2018, the stadium was the home field of F.A. Euro New York of USL League Two (USL2).

On November 13, 2016, the stadium hosted the Soccer Bowl, the championship game of the North American Soccer League (NASL), between the New York Cosmos and the Indy Eleven. The Cosmos won on penalties 4–2 in front of a crowd of 2,150. The Cosmos also played several U.S. Open Cup matches at the stadium in 2015 and 2016.

The stadium is also the home field of the New York Pancyprian-Freedoms of the Cosmopolitan Soccer League of the United States Adult Soccer Association.

References

External links
Belson Stadium

F.C. New York
St. John's Red Storm soccer
Jamaica, Queens
College soccer venues in the United States
Soccer venues in New York City
Sports venues in Queens, New York
Sports venues completed in 2002
Ultimate (sport) venues
2002 establishments in New York City
New York City FC II